W. H. Winborne House is a historic home located at Conway in Horry County, South Carolina. It was built about 1925 and is a brick -story, rectangular plan, cross-gable-roofed American Craftsman-style residence.  The façade features a broad peaked gable over an integral porch which wraps three sides.

It was listed on the National Register of Historic Places in 1986.

References

External links
Winborne, W. H., House - Conway, South Carolina - U.S. National Register of Historic Places on Waymarking.com

Houses on the National Register of Historic Places in South Carolina
Houses completed in 1925
Houses in Horry County, South Carolina
National Register of Historic Places in Horry County, South Carolina
Buildings and structures in Conway, South Carolina